Patty Parsons (born in West Virginia) is the former soulful lead singer of AnExchange, a Marin County, California-based folk rock group of the early 1970s.

Patty is the aunt of Kat Parsons, a Los Angeles-based singer-songwriter.

External links 
 
 Patty Parsons
AnExchange
 History of AnExchange
 Laughing Stock Theatre Company

American folk singers
AnExchange members
Year of birth missing (living people)
Living people
Singers from West Virginia